Fengmen Subdistrict is a former subdistrict of Gusu District, Suzhou, Jiangsu, China. The subdistrict was abolished on March 24, 2017 when it was merged into Shuangta Subdistrict.

Administrative divisions 
In 2016, before its abolition, Youxin Subdistrict administered the following 11 residential communities:

 Fengxi Community
 Changdao Community
 Heng Street Community
 Hongfeng Community
 Yangzhi Community
 Midu Community
 Lihe Community
 Cuiyuan Community
 Lianqing Community
 Xingxiu Community
 Chengwan Community

See also
List of township-level divisions of Suzhou
Shuangta Subdistrict

References

Gusu District

Former township-level divisions of Suzhou